Federico Delbonis (born 5 October 1990) is an Argentine professional tennis player. He has a career-high ATP singles ranking of No. 33 achieved on 9 May 2016. He also has a career-high doubles ranking of No. 110 achieved on 22 July 2019.

Professional career

2009–2012
Delbonis won five Challenger and Futures titles from the time he turned professional in 2009 until 2013.
In 2011, Delbonis reached the first ATP semifinal of his career at the Mercedes Cup in Stuttgart, Germany. He won 6 consecutive matches, having to win 3 qualifying matches in order to enter the main draw, ultimately falling to Juan Carlos Ferrero in three sets.

2013: First ATP final
He qualified at the 2013 International German Open and then beat Tommy Robredo, Dmitry Tursunov and Fernando Verdasco, the latter of which he won in a tight three-setter to set up a meeting in the semifinals with Roger Federer. Against Federer, Delbonis scored by far the biggest win of his career, defeating him in two tiebreaker to book a place in the first ATP Tour final of his career. He finished runner-up to Fabio Fognini, squandering a set and 4–1 lead and failing to convert three match points. Due to his strong performance, his tour ranking soared into the top 100 for the first time in his career.

2014: First ATP title
In 2014 he went on to win his first ATP title when he defeated Paolo Lorenzi in three sets, at the 2014 Brasil Open. It was their first tour level match against each other, however Lorenzi has won against Delbonis in past three Challenger events. The win enabled to reach a new men's singles high ranking of 44.

2016: Second ATP title, best season & top 35 debut, Davis cup winner

Delbonis started his season at the 2016 Apia International Sydney. He beat Sam Groth in the first round in straight sets. In his second round he played Teymuraz Gabashvili losing in straight sets 3–6, 3–6. Delbonis then played at the first major of the year at the 2016 Australian Open. In the first round he upset 22nd seed Ivo Karlović after Karlović had to retire in the third set. Delbonis then reached the third round of a major for the first time in his career after beating Renzo Olivo in the second round in five sets. He then lost in straight sets to 14th seed Gilles Simon.

Delbonis next played at the 2016 Argentina Open. He beat 6th seed Fabio Fognini in the first round after being a set down. He lost his second round match to eventual finalist Nicolás Almagro in three sets. Delbonis played in another clay court tournament at the 2016 Rio Open. In his first round he beat 6th seed Jack Sock in straight sets. He followed this up with another win in straight sets in the second round beating Paolo Lorenzi. He then lost in the quarterfinals against eventual champion Pablo Cuevas in straight sets. He then played in his third straight clay court tournament at the 2016 Brasil Open as the 4th seed. He got a bye pass in the first round. In the second round he beat Diego Schwartzman after being a set down. In the quarterfinals he lost to Íñigo Cervantes.

Delbonis next competed at the first Masters 1000 of the year at the 2016 Indian Wells Masters. In the first round he defeated Santiago Giraldo in straight sets. In the second round he defeated 32nd seed João Sousa also in straight sets. In the third round Delbonis earned his biggest win of his career defeating 2nd seed Andy Murray in three sets. This was Delbonis's third top 10 win. In the fourth round he lost to 13th seed Gaël Monfils in straight sets 3–6, 4–6. Delbonis next competed at the 2016 Miami Open. In the first round he defeated wildcard Elias Ymer in three sets. In the second round he lost to 26th seed Grigor Dimitrov.

Delbonis next chose to compete at the 2016 Grand Prix Hassan II as the 4th seed. He received a bye pass for the first round. In the second round he defeated Thiemo de Bakker in straight sets. He then defeated 7th seed Pablo Carreño Busta in the quarterfinals also in straight sets. In the semifinals In the semifinals he defeated Albert Montañés once again in straight sets. He won his second career title without dropping a set the entire tournament by defeating 3rd seed Borna Ćorić in the final in straight sets. He then competed at the 2016 Monte-Carlo Rolex Masters. He had a disappointing loss to wildcard Fernando Verdasco 0–6, 3–6. Delbonis then played at the 2016 BRD Năstase Țiriac Trophy as the 3rd seed. He received a bye pass in the first round. In the second round he defeated Illya Marchenko in straight sets. In the quarterfinals he defeated Marco Cecchinato also in straight sets. In the semifinals he lost to Lucas Pouille 3–6, 2–6.

Delbonis then competed at the 2016 Istanbul Open as the 4th seed. He received a bye pass for the first round. In the second round he defeated Dudi Sela in three sets. In the quarterfinal he defeated Albert Ramos-Viñolas in straight sets. In the semifinals he lost to eventual champion Diego Schwartzman despite winning the first set. Delbonis then competed at the 2016 Geneva Open as the 6th seed. In the first round he defeated wildcard Janko Tipsarević in straight sets. In the second round he defeated last years champion Thomaz Bellucci in straight sets. In the quarterfinals he lost to 3rd seed and eventual runner up Marin Čilić 4–6, 3–6. Delbonis next competed at the second major of the year at the 2016 French Open as the 31st seed which marks the first time Delbonis has been seeded at a major. He was eliminated in the first round losing to Pablo Carreño Busta in four sets.

Delbonis next competed at the third major of the year, the 2016 Wimbledon Championships. In the first round, he faced Fabio Fognini and lost in an epic five setter 4–6, 6–1, 7–6(7–3), 2–6, 3–6. Delbonis then played for Argentina in the Davis Cup quarterfinals against Italy. He beat Andreas Seppi and Fabio Fognini, both in four sets, to help clinch the tie 3–1. In the finals of Davis Cup, he lost against Marin Cilic in five sets but beat Ivo Karlovic in straight sets in the fifth and deciding rubber to give Argentina their first Davis Cup.

2021: First Masters quarterfinal, back to top 50, first Major fourth round
In March, Delbonis reached his 5th doubles final in 2 years since his last doubles title, at the 2021 Chile Open partnering with Jaume Munar.

In May, Delbonis reached his maiden Masters 1000 quarterfinal in singles in Rome. He defeated
12th seeded David Goffin and Felix Auger Aliassime in the second and third round respectively. He lost to Reilly Opelka in the quarterfinals in straight sets. With his best showing at a Masters, he returned to the top 50 in the singles rankings in over 4 years, since March 2017.

In the lead-up to the French Open, Delbonis also played in the second tournament in Belgrade, where he reached the semifinals, losing to qualifier Alex Molčan.

Delbonis made his best Grand Slam run in his career by reaching the fourth round at the French Open, having never being past the second round at a Major, after defeating Radu Albot, Pablo Andújar and 27th seed Fabio Fognini. He lost to Alejandro Davidovich Fokina in the round of 16.

Delbonis made the semifinals in Hamburg, after saving 4 match points in his quarterfinal match against Benoît Paire. He then lost to Pablo Carreño Busta in straight sets.

2022: Loss of form, out of top 100
He reached the semifinals at the 2022 Argentina Open defeating again Fabio Fognini before losing to eventual champion Casper Ruud.

He recorded his only Major win for the season at the 2022 French Open against Adrian Mannarino. He lost in the first round at the 2022 Wimbledon Championships. He qualified for the US Open, but also lost in the first round to John Isner. It was the fifth straight year Delbonis had lost in the first round of the US Open.

ATP career finals

Singles: 4 (2 titles, 2 runner-ups)

Doubles: 5 (2 titles, 3 runner-ups)

Team competitions finals

Davis Cup: 1 (1 title)

ATP Challenger and ITF Futures Finals

Singles: 22 (12–10)

Doubles: 14 (4–10)

Performance timelines

Singles
Current through the 2022 Monte Carlo Masters.

Doubles

Record against other players

Record against top 10 players
Delbonis's match record against those who have been ranked in the Top 10, with those who have been No. 1 in boldface, and retired players in italics.

  Pablo Carreño Busta 5–4
  Fabio Fognini 4–5
  Karen Khachanov 2–0
  Tommy Robredo 2–0
  Juan Mónaco 2–2
  Gilles Simon 2–2
  Diego Schwartzman 2–5
  Felix Auger-Aliassime 1–0
  Nikolay Davydenko 1–0
  Nicolás Massú 1–0
  Jack Sock 1–0
  Juan Martín del Potro 1–1
  Roger Federer 1–1
  David Goffin 1–1
  John Isner 1–1
  Andy Murray 1–1
  Janko Tipsarević 1–1
  Fernando Verdasco 1–1
  Stan Wawrinka 1–1
  Grigor Dimitrov 1–2
  Casper Ruud 1–2
  Nicolás Almagro 1–3
  David Ferrer 1–3
  Carlos Alcaraz 0–1
  Roberto Bautista Agut 0–1
  Matteo Berrettini 0–1
  Novak Djokovic 0–1
  Juan Carlos Ferrero 0–1
  Richard Gasquet 0–1
  Ernests Gulbis 0–1
  Daniil Medvedev 0–1
  Jannik Sinner 0–1
  Jürgen Melzer 0–1
  Kei Nishikori 0–1
  Cameron Norrie 0–1
  Lucas Pouille 0–1
  Denis Shapovalov 0–1
  Gaël Monfils 0–2
  Andrey Rublev 0–2
  Mikhail Youzhny 0–2
  Kevin Anderson 0–3
  Marin Čilić 0–3
  Dominic Thiem 0–3
  Alexander Zverev 0–3
  Rafael Nadal 0–5

* Statistics correct .

Wins over top 10 players per season
He has a  record against players who were, at the time the match was played, ranked in the top 10.

* Statistics correct .

Notes

References

External links

1990 births
Living people
Argentine male tennis players
Argentine people of Italian descent
Olympic tennis players of Argentina
Sportspeople from Buenos Aires Province
Tennis players at the 2016 Summer Olympics